Kya Mast Hai Life is an Indian teen sitcom television series which ran on Disney Channel India from 27 April 2009 to 7 July 2010. The series produced by Sol Productions had 130 episodes. The show focused on the lives of five college friends: Ragini ('Rags'), Zeeshan ('Zee'), Zenia, Ritu ('Rits') and Vir.

Plot
The show revolves around five college friends and their daily comical lives.

Season 1
Ragini "Rags" Juneja is a teenager and the daughter of the Bollywood megastar Sushmita Juneja. At her new college, Redfield Academy, she meets Zenia Khan, Zeeshan Khan aka Zee (Zenia's twin brother), Vir Mehra, and Ritu Shah: a gang of inseparable childhood friends. She doesn't want anyone to know that she is the daughter of a famous actress and wants to make friends on her own, not for who her parents are. She lies to them and says that her mom is a kindergarten teacher and that she is not a good singer, despite her being excellent at it. Her friends eventually find out her secrets and, while initially angry, they eventually forgive her. Every episode has a different story revolving around the gang in college, at the end of season 1, the gang eventually pairs up and they start developing feelings for each other, the episodes become more connected with one another. Their college was going to almost close but the gang did a CONCERT with such spirit that they saved the college .This concert is something very special in the gang's life as they make very important decisions and face many tough challenges on their way to save the college.

Season 2
The events of the second season take place during summer vacations. Zee works at a bookstore in which Mr. Mandal is temporarily in charge. Ritu is shown to be in Ahmedabad. Zee and Zenia's mother is introduced. The season starts with Zee discovering a magic potion that makes the last thoughts of the characters come true. When Ritu returns, Ragini, Zee, Zenia, and Vir have a wonderful adventure with the magic potion. But when they visit Ragini in Thailand, the magic potion turns out to be a ghost who wants to take revenge on the gang because of a mistake Zee made. Zee eventually defeats him, and they celebrate Ragini's birthday happily. They all breathe a sigh of relief thinking that the magic potion which had caused them so much trouble was gone, but it is actually back in Zee's bag. The series ends with a triumphant episode and it says that the five will be best friends forever.

Episodes

Season 1 
There are a total of 104 episodes. All episodes are available in Disney India's official YouTube Channel

• 01) New Girl in College

• 02) Tell Me About Your Family

• 03) Prepping for the Party

• 04) Let's Party

• 05) Vir in Hospital

• 06) Vir's Blood Phobia

• 07) The Bodyguard

• 08) Divya Disclosed

• 09) Forgetful Zenia

• 10) Learn to Say No

• 11) Getting the Role

• 12) A Good Friend

• 13) Rose Day

• 14) Talking About Zee

• 15) More Secrets

• 16) The End of Secrets

• 17) All Revealed

• 18) Dealing with Issues

• 19) Ritu the Hacker

• 20) The Unknown Gift

• 21) Class President (The Election - Part 1)

• 22) Zenia v/s Rags (The Election - Part 2)

• 23) Ritu's Fashion

• 24) Vir's Aunt

• 25) Pochku

• 26) Music Club

• 27) Mom in College

• 28) Dare Time

• 29) Becoming a Mascot

• 30) Vir Hogger

• 31) Rags v/s Titlis (The Fashion Show - Part 1)

• 32) Fashion Fight (The Fashion Show - Part 1)

• 33) Exchanging Gifts

• 34) Learning the Basics

• 35) Movie Plans

• 36) Getting Punishments

• 37) Treating with Respect (The Ladies Man - Part 1)

• 38) Help with Girls (The Ladies Man - Part 2)

• 39) Night in College (Astronomy Camp - Part 1)

• 40) Ghost in College (Astronomy Camp - Part 2)

• 41) Sibling's Commercial

• 42) Hypnotism

• 43) Birthday Gifts List

• 44) Teacher's Day

• 45) Zenia v/s Titlis

• 46) Slim Jango

• 47) Going for a Date

• 48) No Time for Friends

• 49) Women Power

• 50) Secret Spills

• 51) Becoming Detectives

• 52) Newspaper Articles

• 53) Lost Phone

• 54) Chicken Pox Mania

• 55) Changing Names

• 56) Vir's Movie

• 57) Boyfriend Rumours

• 58) The Camping Trip

• 59) Paresh Bhai in Love

• 60) New Titli

• 61) Ramu Kaka in College

• 62) Cute Boys List

• 63) New Principal

• 64) Zee's Pranks

• 65) Prepare for the Audition

• 66) Rags v/s Ritu

• 67) Teacher's Training

• 68) Audition Day

• 69) Truth or Lie

• 70) Forgive Me

• 71) Party for Rags

• 72) Convincing Dadi

• 73) Too Much Homework

• 74) Method Acting

• 75) Let's Hustle

• 76) Alien Attack

• 77) Lost Phone and Prank Calls

• 78) Science 🧪 vs Arts 🎞️

• 79) Master Babyshwer in College

• 80) Struggle with the Fly and Zee's amnesia

• 81) Frenemy in College

• 82) Mind Reading

• 83) Becoming a Macho Man, Rags PJs

• 84) The Future

• 85) Best Friends Forever

• 86) Zee in Debt

• 87) Bro-Sis Fight

• 88) College Inspection

• 89) Zenia determined to save Redfield

• 90) Petitions

• 91) Fest O Concert to save Redfield

• 92) Vir and Rags' in love and misunderstandings arise

• 93) Vir and Rags agree to perform

• 94) Zee and Zenia fight.

• 95) Locked in a Room

• 96) Fest O Concert is of no use? Rags and Vir confession

• 97) Zee supports Zenia

• 98) Sunshine and Cuddly buns

• 99) Ritu's heartbreak

• 100) Disappointing the parents

• 101) Fest-o-concert begins (Part 1), Kimmy's fashion show, Zenia proposes Jango

• 102) Fest-o-concert (Part 2), Zee's performance, Baby sir- Disco performance

• 103) Fest-o-concert (Part 3), Ritu's performance, Mr.Mandal proposes Ms.Dsouza

• 104) A happy ending

Cast

Main
 Nazneen Ghaani as Ragini Juneja aka "Rags" : She is Vir's Girlfriend. Ritu, Zee and Zenia's best friend. Sushmita Juneja and Ravi Juneja's daughter. Her grandmother's name is Radha Juneja. Ritu and Zenia's bestie.
 Shaheer Sheikh as Vir Mehra: He is Rags' boyfriend. Ritu, Zee, and Zenia's best friend. Zee's "chuddy buddy" best friend. Mr. Mehra and Panchi Mehra's son. He has an army aunt named Anita. Ramu kaka is his caretaker.
 Sana Amin Sheikh as Ritu Shah aka "BBB"(Bin Badal Barsaat)/"Rits": She is Vir, Rags, Zee and Zenia's best friend. She lives in a joint family. She has a cousin sister named Guddie. She also has an annoying cousin named Paresh Bhai. She had a crush on Vir but later fell in love with Aryan. Rags and Zenia's bestie.
 Ashish Juneja as Zeeshan Khan aka " Zee": Vir, Rags, Ritu's best friend. Zenia's twin brother. Mrs. Zarina Khan's son. Kimmy's boyfriend. Vir's "chuddy buddy" best friend.
 Shweta Tripathi as Zenia Khan: Vir, Rags, and Ritu's best friend. Zee's twin sister. Mrs. Zarina Khan's daughter. Jango's girlfriend. Rags and Ritu's bestie.

Recurring
 Vishakha Dugarh as Kimmy: She is the lead of Titlis. Zee's girlfriend. She had a crush on Vir but later she realized her love for Zee. She is a fashionista. Her catchphrase is How Downmartket!
 Manini Mishra as Sushmita Juneja: Rags mother. She is a mega filmstar and film producer Ravi Juneja's wife.
 Sumana Das as Riya: She is also a titli. She is with Kimmy since the start of college.
Romy Gupta as Liya: She used to be a titli. She was the replacement for Tiya.
 Reena Aggarwal as Tiya: She used to be a Titli, but later she left abroad for further studies.
Anamika Bhalla as Diya : She is a Titli. She is the replacement for Liya.
 Sonali Sachdev as Ms. Sandra D'Souza: She is the dramatics teacher of Redfield Academy. She often gets into fights with Mr. Mandal, although she likes him. Her idol is "Shakespeare".
 Bhuvnesh Shetty as
 Mr. Priyanshu Mandal: the Hindi teacher of Redfield Academy. His favorite student is Ritu Shah. He speaks in pure Hindi. He fights with Ms. D'souza, although he also likes her. He is also a big fan of Sushmita Juneja (Rags Mom).
 Himanshu Mandal aka H.M Mandal: He is a retired principal of a college and Mr. Mandal's father.
 Manmauji Mishra as Ramu Kaka: He is Vir's caretaker. He is very caring to Vir and his friends.
 Prabal Panjabi as Jankidas Govind aka "Jango": He is the college bully, who used to especially bully Zee due to a misconception during Vir's birthday. He is Zenia's boyfriend. He is a very good friend to Disco, the canteen manager.
 Rajesh Jais as Mr. Babyswhar a.k.a. 'Baby Sir': He is the principal of Redfield Academy. He is a fun-loving principal who believes in magic. He often gives lessons to the best friend's gang in different kinds of ways.
Rajatdeep Singh Sandhu as Disco: the canteen manager of Redfield Academy. He is quite friendly to his customers. He is a very good friend to Jango.
Iqbal Khan as Mr. Chotu: Rags bodyguard. He does not speak because he has a voice like a rat. Zee has only heard his voice. He and Zee are friends after that.
 Devansh Doshi as Paresh Bhai: He is Ritu's cousin, he often irritates her and the gang. But sometimes he turned out to be helpful too. He is a world-class dandiya champion. He speaks in a Gujarati tone.
Rohit Vijay Bhardwaj as Aryan: He is Ritu's Boyfriend. He is a Mathematics Olympiad Champion.
 Hiten Tejwani as Mr. Singhania
 Mihir Mishra as Mr. Mehra: He is Vir's father, a doctor who wants to make his son a doctor. But Vir wants to be a musician, which leads them into arguments.
Sadhana Sharma as Panchi Mehra: Vir's mother.
 Delnaaz Irani as Mrs. Zarina Khan : Zeeshan and Zenia's mother.
 Alan Kapoor as Buzz Sharma
 Vishal Malhotra as Maya Mantar

Production
Antoine Villeneuve, a senior vice-president and managing director, Walt Disney Television International India, said, "Teens today are wise and wired. Kya Mast Hai Life follows Disney Channel's philosophy of reflecting them, their families, their universe in an entertaining, safe and family-inclusive environment." The channel commissioned production house SOL to produce the show.

Fazila Allana, managing director of Sol production company SOL, said, "We are excited about producing our first fiction show with a leading teen and family television brand like Disney Channel. SOL is well known for its expertise in non-fiction programming and television events. We look forward to establishing similar success with Kya Mast Hai Life in the fiction genre."

Soundtrack

The entire soundtrack was sung by the members of the pop group Aasma.

See also
List of Disney Channel (India) series

References

External links
 
 Official Disney Channel: Kya Mast Hai Life website

Disney Channel (Indian TV channel) original programming
Television series by Disney
2009 Indian television series debuts
2010 Indian television series endings
Indian teen sitcoms
Hindi-language television shows